Liar Liar is a 1997 Jim Carrey film.

Liar Liar may also refer to:
 Liar, Liar (1993 film), a TV movie
 "Liar! Liar!, "a song by B'z
 "Liar Liar" (Cris Cab song)
 "Liar, Liar" (The Castaways song), a song covered by Debbie Harry
 "Liar Liar", a 2013 song by Avicii from True
 "Liar Liar" (Christina Grimmie song), 2011
 "Liar, Liar", a 2008 song by In Fiction from The Forecast 
 "Liar Liar", a 2016 song by Oh My Girl from Pink Ocean
 "Liar Liar (Burn in Hell)", a 2007 song by the Used from Lies for the Liars
 "Liar Liar GE2017", a 2017 song by Captain SKA
 Liar Liar (novel series), a Japanese light novel series
 Liar × Liar, a Japanese manga series by Renjūrō Kindaichi

See also
 Liar (disambiguation)
 Pants on Fire (disambiguation)